Natonin, officially the Municipality of Natonin, is a 4th class municipality in the province of Mountain Province, Philippines. According to the 2020 census, it has a population of 10,339 people.

Geography
It is a landlocked municipality bordered by Kalinga Province to the North, Paracelis to the East, Barlig to the West and Ifugao to the South. The barangays are mostly carved at the foot of the mountains along which the now National Highway was carved with the exception Barangay Maducayan and some far-flung sitios of Barangay Banawel.  It has a total land area of around 20 000 hectares.

Barangays
Natonin is politically subdivided into 11 barangays. These barangays are headed by elected officials: Barangay Captain, Barangay Council, whose members are called Barangay Councilors. All are elected every three years.

 Alunogan
 Balangao
 Banao
 Banawel
 Butac
 Maducayan
 Poblacion
 Saliok
 Santa Isabel
 Tonglayan
 Pudo

Climate

Demographics

The natives of Natonin are generally called Balangaos, or Iferangao, and speak the Finerangao language. There are two sub-tribes: the Hakki, who inhabit the western part of the town, and the iMajukayongs (people of the subtribe Majukayong), who inhabit the barangays of Saliok and Maducayan. The iMajukayongs initially came from southern Kalinga Province. Populations of the town are of Igorot lineage. Headhunting was practiced throughout Natonin as late as the mid-1930s, but was set aside in favor of Christianity and education after World War II.

Languages
Natonin is home to two indigenous dialects which have existed there since before the arrival of the Spanish: the Balangaw dialect and the Majukayong dialect. Immigrants from the Ilocos Region came in the 1970s and imported the Ilokano dialect during the era of martial law.

Economy 

The primary crop is rice, although limited arable space, mechanization and innovative agriculture renders the harvest to a subsistence level only. Backyard piggery mostly produce the pork supply. Vegetable gardening, fruit tree growing and tilapia raising are also starting to see commercial viability. Whatever is of shortage or lacking are imported outside the municipality. Few local handicrafts are promoted and are only made to order.

Government
Natonin, belonging to the lone congressional district of the province of Mountain Province, is governed by a mayor designated as its local chief executive and by a municipal council as its legislative body in accordance with the Local Government Code. The mayor, vice mayor, and the councilors are elected directly by the people through an election which is being held every three years.

Elected officials

Members of the Municipal Council (2019–2022):
 Congressman: Maximo Y. Dalog Jr.
 Mayor: Jose T. Agagon
 Vice-Mayor: Raymundo L. Lapasen
 Councilors:
 Rafael Bulawe
 Jose F. Biangalen
 Leon Pangsiw
 Jimmy G. Todco
 Fernandez Linggayo
 Jerry N. Chumilang
 Fernando Magranga Jr.
 Oscar Fangonon

Transportation
Since the widening of the national highways started in 2010, the Paracelis-Natonin Road is paved now. Although, some parts are either eroded or slipped away, and during rainy seasons landslides can render the roads impassable. Public utility or for-hire vans are the easiest transportation either to and from the municipality (e.g. Baguio and Manila).

Tourism
Though it's not yet that improved, Natonin has the following sites:
 The Legendary Silent Mountain of Finaratan, located in Barangay Maducayan.
 The Apatan Rice Terraces 
 The Balococ Waterfall
 The Naropaan Waterfall
 Tonglayan Rice Terraces
 Lagan River in Balangao
 Penadna Waterfalls
 Lettalet Waterfalls
 Fuyon Spring in Siffu River located at Brgy. Saliok

References

External links

 [ Philippine Standard Geographic Code]
Philippine Census Information

Municipalities of Mountain Province